The EMD G16 is a diesel locomotive built by General Motors in the US and under licence by Clyde Engineering in Australia and MACOSA in Spain. It has been used in Australia, Brazil, Egyptian Railways, Hong Kong, Israel Railways, Mexico, Spain, Yugoslav Railways and on the successor Croatian Railways, Slovenian Railways, Serbian Railways, Macedonian Railways, Republika Srpska Railways, Kosovo Railways and Railways of the Federation of Bosnia and Herzegovina.

Australia

The Victorian Railways bought six G16C locomotives locally built by Clyde Engineering, known as the X class. They are now operated by Pacific National.

Brazil
In Brazil 41 locomotives were imported. The first eleven were introduced in 1962 and numbered 601–641, and the remaining thirty locomotives were imported in 1964–66. 37 locomotives still operate trains on the Vitória a Minas Railroad.

Egypt
EMD supplied Egyptian Railways with 111 G16s in 1960–61 (ER numbers 3301–61) and seventeen G16Ws in 1964–65 (ER numbers 3362–411).

Iran 

20 60.301–60.320

Israel 
During the Six-Day War, Israel captured Egyptian Railways 3304, 3329 and 3361 which were appropriated into Israel Railways stock as numbers 301–303, later 161–163. All have now been withdrawn from service but 163 (formerly ER 3361) is preserved at the Israel Railway Museum.

Hong Kong
In Hong Kong there are four locomotives imported for the Kowloon–Canton Railway. They would later be used by the MTR Corporation upon the merger. The first three were built by EMD in the US, introduced in 1961 and numbered 56–58. The fourth was built by Clyde Engineering in Australia, introduced in 1966 and numbered 59. They were named I.B. Trevor, Bobby Howes, Gordon Graham, and Gerry Forsgate respectively. All were equipped with 16-567C engines and Co-Co wheel arrangements. 59 suffered a collision and was rebuilt with a 16-645E engine. 57 retired in 2009 and was scrapped in late 2014, while 59 retired in 2018 after suffering serious damage from a collision with a EMD G26 locomotive. As of 2022, all the remaining G16s have retired in Hong Kong.

Mexico
In order to replace steam on the numerous light rail branches operated by the Nacionales de Mexico (N de M), EMD export models G12 and G16 were obtained. A total of 24 G16 units were built by EMD for the N de M, all equipped with dynamic brakes and introduced between August 1958 and July 1960, their running numbers being 7300 to 7323. The first thirteen units (Nr. 7300 to 7312) had close clearance cabs, and the last eleven units (Nr. 7313 to 7323) were delivered in 1960 and received a standard cab. No.7323 was pictured in 1963 with a standard cab, but appeared in 1974 with a close clearance cab, indicating that this unit was either rebuilt or more probably renumbered. Mexican railroaders nicknamed this locomotive as "Tlaconete", referring to the imperial salamander; it was the first engine that was painted in the olive green, red and white scheme that was kept until 1987.

Spain

The RENFE Class 1900, later known as RENFE Class 319 were to the G16 design. Ten of the units were built at General Motors factory in the US and were single cabin machines, identical to a standard G16 with the exception of having Iberian gauge  wheelsets. A further 93 locomotives were built under license using the same components but as twin-cab machines with a different external appearance and internal arrangement of components.

Yugoslav Railways
The EMD G16 (JŽ series 661) was one of the most used diesel locomotives in Yugoslavia. The type is colloquially nicknamed "Kenedi" after the US President John F. Kennedy. After the breakup in 1991, the locomotives were passed on to successor states:

Croatia
In Croatia the locomotive is classified HŽ series 2061. As of 2007, the series has been withdrawn from service. Six units of the series were modified by removing two of the traction engines into series 2043 locomotives during the early 1990s. None remain in active service.

Serbia, Bosnia and Herzegovina, North Macedonia and Slovenia
In Serbia, Bosnia and Herzegovina, North Macedonia and Slovenia have all kept the JŽ-era designation series 661.

Today there are around fifteen operational series 661s on Serbian Railways. Those locomotives are used mostly on non-electrified railways, primarily to haul freight trains, but also international passenger trains. 

In Slovenia, the last 661 series locomotive ran on 17 May 2013, and it is now preserved as a historical unit.
In 2014 it was brought back in service and is still in operation until 26. 9. 2026

Kosovo
Kosovo Railways operates three former JŽ series 661. A fourth locomotive (001) was renumbered but is out of service. They no longer carry a type designation, instead they were just numbered 001 to 004. They are used to haul coal and clay trains.

Locomotive 661-203 began a rebuilding program in 2008, undertaken by TŽV Gredelj (Croatia) in association with Electro-Motive Diesel; the bogies and traction motors were retained, but with a new frame and engine (EMD 8-710G3A). The locomotives were also converted to twin cab designs. The resulting new loco has EMD model code JT38CW-DC.

Zambia

Gallery

See also
Rolling stock of the Croatian Railways

References

External links

2061 G16 at zeljeznice.net (in Croatian)

G16
Clyde Engineering locomotives
 
Diesel-electric locomotives of Brazil
Diesel-electric locomotives of Egypt
Diesel-electric locomotives of Hong Kong
Diesel-electric locomotives of Israel
Diesel-electric locomotives of Mexico
Diesel-electric locomotives of Spain
Diesel-electric locomotives of Yugoslavia
Diesel-electric locomotives of Croatia
Diesel-electric locomotives of Kosovo
Diesel-electric locomotives of North Macedonia
Diesel-electric locomotives of Serbia
Diesel-electric locomotives of Slovenia
Six-Day War
Diesel-electric locomotives of Montenegro
Metre gauge diesel locomotives
Standard gauge locomotives of Australia
5 ft 6 in gauge locomotives
Standard gauge locomotives of Egypt
Standard gauge locomotives of Israel
Standard gauge locomotives of Hong Kong
Standard gauge locomotives of Mexico
Standard gauge locomotives of Yugoslavia
Standard gauge locomotives of Croatia
Standard gauge locomotives of Serbia
Standard gauge locomotives of Bosnia and Herzegovina
Standard gauge locomotives of North Macedonia
Standard gauge locomotives of Slovenia
Standard gauge locomotives of Kosovo